Pseudonoorda edulis is a moth in the family Crambidae. It was described by Koen V. N. Maes and René Noël Poligui in 2012. It is found in Cameroon, Gabon and Ivory Coast.

The larvae feed on Dacryodes edulis.

References

Moths described in 2012
Odontiinae